Caribe is a Venezuelan telenovela written by Mariela Romero and produced by Radio Caracas Televisión in 1990. This telenovela lasted 176 episodes and was distributed internationally by RCTV International.

Carolina Perpetuo, Jaime Araque and Miguel de León starred as the main protagonists.

Synopsis
The small island of Caribe is located in the Atlantic Ocean. Its inhabitants are hardworking, gentle people that have been victims of the avarice and cruelty of its rulers - Eleazar and Margot Bustamante. Some thirty years ago, they committed a terrible crime for which they ultimately will pay heavily. This is a story of a beautiful country, its struggle for sovereignty and a woman's passion for life and love.

Manolita Contreras, an aspiring writer, becomes dramatically conscious of life in Caribe - surrounded by adversaries. Luis Alfredo Alfonso, a young aristocrat, gives Manolita the strength and support she needs. Their love is so strong that together they can face everything.

Caribe is passionate, mysterious, intriguing, and packed with conflict. It is a fictional place filled with the realities of life...the harbor of dreams and the magic of love.

Cast
Carolina Perpetuo as Manuela Contreras
Jaime Araque as Lorenzo
Miguel de León as Luis Alfredo
Carlos Cámara Jr. as Roberto Castell
Marcos Campos as Angel Molina
Héctor Mayerston as Eleazar Bustamante
Dora Mazzone as Aminta
Miriam Ochoa as Margot
Francis Romero as Elvira Contreras
Ileanna Simancas as Maria Eugenia
Elisa Stella as Matilda
Rosita Vasquez as Valeria

References

External links

1990 telenovelas
RCTV telenovelas
1990 Venezuelan television series debuts
1991 Venezuelan television series endings
Venezuelan telenovelas
Spanish-language telenovelas
Television shows set in Venezuela